The 1999–2000 New York Rangers season was the franchise's 74th season. In the regular season, the Rangers finished in fourth place in the Atlantic Division with a 29–38–12–3 record. New York failed to qualify for the Stanley Cup playoffs for the third straight season.

For the second time in three seasons, the Rangers fired their head coach during the regular season. John Muckler, who took the position after Colin Campbell's firing in 1997–98, was himself fired with four games left in the season. General manager Neil Smith was also fired, bringing an end to his tenure which had seen the Rangers win the Stanley Cup but also fall on hard times.

Regular season

Final standings

Schedule and results

|- align="center" bgcolor="white"
| 1 || 1 || @ Edmonton Oilers || 1–1 OT ||T|| 0–0–1–0
|- align="center" bgcolor="#FFBBBB"
| 2 || 2 || @ Vancouver Canucks || 2–1 ||L|| 0–1–1–0
|- align="center" bgcolor="#FFBBBB"
| 3 || 5 || Ottawa Senators || 2–1 || L||0–2–1–0
|- align="center" bgcolor="#CCFFCC"
| 4 || 8 || Carolina Hurricanes || 3–1 ||W|| 1–2–1–0
|- align="center" bgcolor="#CCFFCC"
| 5 || 10 || Phoenix Coyotes || 4–2 ||W|| 2–2–1–0
|- align="center" bgcolor="#CCFFCC"
| 6 || 11 || @ New York Islanders || 4–2 || W||3–2–1–0
|- align="center" bgcolor="#FFBBBB"
| 7 || 14 || Pittsburgh Penguins || 5–2 || L||3–3–1–0
|- align="center" bgcolor="#CCFFCC"
| 8 || 17 || Atlanta Thrashers || 4–1 || W||4–3–1–0
|- align="center" bgcolor="#FFBBBB"
| 9 || 19 || San Jose Sharks || 2–1 || L||4–4–1–0
|- align="center" bgcolor="#FFBBBB"
| 10 || 20 || @ Philadelphia Flyers || 5–0 ||L|| 4–5–1–0
|- align="center" bgcolor="#FFBBBB"
| 11 || 22 || Philadelphia Flyers || 2–0 ||L|| 4–6–1–0
|- align="center" bgcolor="#FFBBBB"
| 12 || 24 || Vancouver Canucks || 3–0 || L||4–7–1–0
|- align="center" bgcolor="white"
| 13 || 30 || @ Montreal Canadiens || 2–2 OT ||T|| 4–7–2–0
|-

|- align="center" bgcolor="white"
| 14 || 3 || New York Islanders || 3–3 OT || T||4–7–3–0
|- align="center" bgcolor="#FFBBBB"
| 15 || 5 || @ Colorado Avalanche || 4–1 || L||4–8–3–0
|- align="center" bgcolor="#CCFFCC"
| 16 || 7 || @ Chicago Blackhawks || 3–1 || W||5–8–3–0
|- align="center" bgcolor="#FFBBBB"
| 17 || 10 || Ottawa Senators || 4–3 || L||5–9–3–0
|- align="center" bgcolor="#CCFFCC"
| 18 || 11 || @ Washington Capitals || 5–4 OT || W||6–9–3–0
|- align="center" bgcolor="#FFBBBB"
| 19 || 13 || Boston Bruins || 5–2 || L||6–10–3–0
|- align="center" bgcolor="#FFBBBB"
| 20 || 18 || @ Boston Bruins || 5–3 || L||6–11–3–0
|- align="center" bgcolor="#FF6F6F"
| 21 || 20 || @ Toronto Maple Leafs || 4–3 OT ||OTL|| 6–11–3–1
|- align="center" bgcolor="#CCFFCC"
| 22 || 24 || @ Tampa Bay Lightning || 6–3 || W||7–11–3–1
|- align="center" bgcolor="#FFBBBB"
| 23 || 26 || @ Florida Panthers || 6–2 || L||7–12–3–1
|-

|- align="center" bgcolor="#FFBBBB"
| 24 || 1 || @ New Jersey Devils || 3–2 || L||7–13–3–1
|- align="center" bgcolor="#CCFFCC"
| 25 || 3 || Montreal Canadiens || 3–2 || W||8–13–3–1
|- align="center" bgcolor="white"
| 26 || 4 || @ Buffalo Sabres || 1–1 OT || T||8–13–4–1
|- align="center" bgcolor="#CCFFCC"
| 27 || 6 || Calgary Flames || 3–2 OT || W||9–13–4–1
|- align="center" bgcolor="#CCFFCC"
| 28 || 8 || Edmonton Oilers || 2–1 OT || W||10–13–4–1
|- align="center" bgcolor="#CCFFCC"
| 29 || 15 || Los Angeles Kings || 8–3 || W||11–13–4–1
|- align="center" bgcolor="#FF6F6F"
| 30 || 17 || Washington Capitals || 3–2 OT || OTL||11–13–4–2
|- align="center" bgcolor="#CCFFCC"
| 31 || 19 || Tampa Bay Lightning || 5–4 OT ||W|| 12–13–4–2
|- align="center" bgcolor="#FFBBBB"
| 32 || 21 || Buffalo Sabres || 3–1 || L||12–14–4–2
|- align="center" bgcolor="#FFBBBB"
| 33 || 23 || @ New York Islanders || 4–2 ||L|| 12–15–4–2
|- align="center" bgcolor="white"
| 34 || 26 || New Jersey Devils || 3–3 OT || T||12–15–5–2
|- align="center" bgcolor="white"
| 35 || 28 || @ Phoenix Coyotes || 2–2 OT || T||12–15–6–2
|- align="center" bgcolor="#FF6F6F"
| 36 || 29 || @ Dallas Stars || 4–3 OT || OTL||12–15–6–3
|-

|- align="center" bgcolor="white"
| 37 || 2 || @ Montreal Canadiens || 2–2 OT ||T|| 12–15–7–3
|- align="center" bgcolor="#FFBBBB"
| 38 || 3 || St. Louis Blues || 5–2 || L||12–16–7–3
|- align="center" bgcolor="#CCFFCC"
| 39 || 5 || Toronto Maple Leafs || 3–2 OT ||W|| 13–16–7–3
|- align="center" bgcolor="#CCFFCC"
| 40 || 8 || @ Toronto Maple Leafs || 5–3 || W||14–16–7–3
|- align="center" bgcolor="#FFBBBB"
| 41 || 9 || @ Carolina Hurricanes || 1–0 || L||14–17–7–3
|- align="center" bgcolor="#CCFFCC"
| 42 || 15 || @ New York Islanders || 5–2 ||W|| 15–17–7–3
|- align="center" bgcolor="#CCFFCC"
| 43 || 16 || Atlanta Thrashers || 6–3 ||W|| 16–17–7–3
|- align="center" bgcolor="#CCFFCC"
| 44 || 18 || Carolina Hurricanes || 3–2 ||W|| 17–17–7–3
|- align="center" bgcolor="#CCFFCC"
| 45 || 20 || @ Carolina Hurricanes || 4–1 ||W|| 18–17–7–3
|- align="center" bgcolor="#CCFFCC"
| 46 || 22 || @ St. Louis Blues || 4–1 ||W|| 19–17–7–3
|- align="center" bgcolor="#CCFFCC"
| 47 || 24 || @ Atlanta Thrashers || 6–3 ||W|| 20–17–7–3
|- align="center" bgcolor="#CCFFCC"
| 48 || 25 || @ Pittsburgh Penguins || 4–3 ||W|| 21–17–7–3
|- align="center" bgcolor="#FFBBBB"
| 49 || 27 || Toronto Maple Leafs || 4–3 ||L|| 21–18–7–3
|- align="center" bgcolor="#FFBBBB"
| 50 || 29 || @ Ottawa Senators || 3–2 ||L|| 21–19–7–3
|- align="center" bgcolor="#CCFFCC"
| 51 || 31 || Nashville Predators || 5–1 ||W|| 22–19–7–3
|-

|- align="center" bgcolor="#FFBBBB"
| 52 || 2 || New Jersey Devils || 3–1 ||L|| 22–20–7–3
|- align="center" bgcolor="#CCFFCC"
| 53 || 3 || @ Atlanta Thrashers || 6–3 ||W|| 23–20–7–3
|- align="center" bgcolor="white"
| 54 || 8 || New Jersey Devils || 2–2 OT ||T|| 23–20–8–3
|- align="center" bgcolor="#FFBBBB"
| 55 || 9 || @ New Jersey Devils || 4–1 ||L|| 23–21–8–3
|- align="center" bgcolor="#CCFFCC"
| 56 || 11 || Boston Bruins || 5–2 ||W|| 24–21–8–3
|- align="center" bgcolor="#FFBBBB"
| 57 || 13 || New York Islanders || 4–2 ||L|| 24–22–8–3
|- align="center" bgcolor="white"
| 58 || 15 || @ Tampa Bay Lightning || 2–2 OT ||T|| 24–22–9–3
|- align="center" bgcolor="#FFBBBB"
| 59 || 16 || @ Florida Panthers || 3–0 ||L|| 24–23–9–3
|- align="center" bgcolor="#FFBBBB"
| 60 || 18 || Colorado Avalanche || 4–2 ||L|| 24–24–9–3
|- align="center" bgcolor="#FFBBBB"
| 61 || 20 || Philadelphia Flyers || 3–2 ||L|| 24–25–9–3
|- align="center" bgcolor="#CCFFCC"
| 62 || 22 || Pittsburgh Penguins || 4–3 ||W|| 25–25–9–3
|- align="center" bgcolor="#CCFFCC"
| 63 || 25 || @ Buffalo Sabres || 6–3 ||W|| 26–25–9–3
|- align="center" bgcolor="#FFBBBB"
| 64 || 26 || @ Ottawa Senators || 4–2 ||L|| 26–26–9–3
|-

|- align="center" bgcolor="white"
| 65 || 1 || Buffalo Sabres || 3–3 OT ||T|| 26–26–10–3
|- align="center" bgcolor="#CCFFCC"
| 66 || 3 || Florida Panthers || 4–2 ||W|| 27–26–10–3
|- align="center" bgcolor="#FFBBBB"
| 67 || 6 || @ San Jose Sharks || 2–1 ||L|| 27–27–10–3
|- align="center" bgcolor="#CCFFCC"
| 68 || 8 || @ Mighty Ducks of Anaheim || 4–3 OT ||W|| 28–27–10–3
|- align="center" bgcolor="#FFBBBB"
| 69 || 9 || @ Los Angeles Kings || 3–1 ||L|| 28–28–10–3
|- align="center" bgcolor="#FFBBBB"
| 70 || 11 || @ Pittsburgh Penguins || 3–1 ||L|| 28–29–10–3
|- align="center" bgcolor="#FFBBBB"
| 71 || 13 || Dallas Stars || 4–3 ||L|| 28–30–10–3
|- align="center" bgcolor="white"
| 72 || 15 || Tampa Bay Lightning || 4–4 OT ||T|| 28–30–11–3
|- align="center" bgcolor="#CCFFCC"
| 73 || 18 || @ Philadelphia Flyers || 3–2 ||W|| 29–30–11–3
|- align="center" bgcolor="#FFBBBB"
| 74 || 19 || @ Pittsburgh Penguins || 5–4 ||L|| 29–31–11–3
|- align="center" bgcolor="#FFBBBB"
| 75 || 21 || Florida Panthers || 4–3 ||L|| 29–32–11–3
|- align="center" bgcolor="#FFBBBB"
| 76 || 23 || Washington Capitals || 4–1 ||L|| 29–33–11–3
|- align="center" bgcolor="#FFBBBB"
| 77 || 26 || @ Detroit Red Wings || 8–2 ||L|| 29–34–11–3
|- align="center" bgcolor="#FFBBBB"
| 78 || 27 || Detroit Red Wings || 6–0 ||L|| 29–35–11–3
|-

|- align="center" bgcolor="white"
| 79 || 1 || @ Boston Bruins || 2–2 OT ||T|| 29–35–12–3
|- align="center" bgcolor="#FFBBBB"
| 80 || 3 || @ Washington Capitals || 4–1 ||L|| 29–36–12–3
|- align="center" bgcolor="#FFBBBB"
| 81 || 5 || Montreal Canadiens || 3–0 ||L|| 29–37–12–3
|- align="center" bgcolor="#FFBBBB"
| 82 || 9 || Philadelphia Flyers || 4–1 ||L|| 29–38–12–3
|-

Player statistics
Skaters

Goaltenders

†Denotes player spent time with another team before joining Rangers. Stats reflect time with Rangers only.
‡Traded mid-season. Stats reflect time with Rangers only.

Draft picks
New York's picks at the 1999 NHL Entry Draft in Boston, Massachusetts, at the FleetCenter.

See also
 1999–2000 NHL season

References

New York Rangers seasons
New York Rangers
New York Rangers
New York Rangers
New York Rangers
1990s in Manhattan
2000s in Manhattan
Madison Square Garden